Kochetovka is a rural locality (a selo) in Kochetovskoye Rural Settlement, Khokholsky District, Voronezh Oblast, Russia. The population was 514 as of 2010. There are 7 streets.

Geography 
Kochetovka is located 31 km south of Khokholsky (the district's administrative centre) by road. Semidesyatnoye is the nearest rural locality.

References 

Rural localities in Khokholsky District